Murray H. Hall (1841 − January 16, 1901) was a New York City bail bondsman and Tammany Hall politician who became famous on his death in 1901, when it was revealed that he was assigned female at birth.

Born in Govan, Scotland as Mary Anderson, Hall reportedly migrated to America after being reported to the police by his first wife and lived as a man for nearly 25 years, able to vote and to work as a politician at a time when women were denied such rights. He also ran a commercial "intelligence office." At the time of his death, he resided with his second wife and their adopted daughter. His gender presentation had been a secret even to his own daughter and friends, whom continued to respect his expression after death. After his death, an aide to a state senator remarked "If he was a woman he ought to have been born a man, for he lived and looked like one."

His last home was an apartment in Greenwich Village, half a block north of the Jefferson Market Courthouse (now the Jefferson Market Library). The building was renumbered in 1929, when Manhattan's  Sixth Avenue was extended south, and is now 453 6th Avenue. The NYC LGBT Historic Sites Project lists the building.

Hall died from breast cancer, treatment for which he seemed to have delayed for fear of exposing his birth assigned gender. He was buried in women's clothes in an unmarked grave in Mount Olivet Cemetery.

References

Further reading

 The San Francisco Lesbian and Gay History Project, "She Even Chewed Tobacco": A Pictorial Narrative of Passing Women in America, in Hidden from History: Reclaiming the Gay and Lesbian Past. Edited by Martin Duberman, Martha Vicinus and George Chauncey, Jr. (New York: Meridian, 1990), 183–194.
 Karen Abbott, "The Mystery of Murray Hall," Smithsonian, July 21, 2011.

External links
 Gender Bender: Mary Masquerades as Murray
  "Murray H. Hall Residence", NYC LGBT Historic Sites Project

Burials at Mount Olivet Cemetery (Queens)
Politicians from New York City
People from Greenwich Village
1901 deaths
People from Govan
1841 births
Transgender history in the United States
Scottish emigrants to the United States
Transgender politicians
Scottish LGBT politicians
LGBT people from New York (state)
American LGBT politicians
1900s in LGBT history